Zavodsky (masculine), Zavodskaya (feminine), or Zavodskoye (neuter) is the name of several rural localities in Russia:
Zavodskoye, Altai Krai, a selo in Zavodskoy Selsoviet of Troitsky District of Altai Krai
Zavodskoye, Kabardino-Balkarian Republic, a selo in Tersky District of the Kabardino-Balkarian Republic
Zavodskoye, Kaliningrad Oblast, a settlement in Ilyushinsky Rural Okrug of Nesterovsky District of Kaliningrad Oblast
Zavodskoye, Kostroma Oblast, a village in Georgiyevskoye Settlement of Mezhevskoy District of Kostroma Oblast

See also
Zavodskoy (inhabited locality)